Aravalli is a village in West Godavari district in the state of Andhra Pradesh in India.

Demographics
 India census, Aravalli has a population of 4777 of which 2377 are males while 2400 are females. The average sex ratio of Aravalli village is 1010. The child population is 410, which makes up 8.58% of the total population of the village, with sex ratio 1030, significantly higher than state average. In 2011, the literacy rate of Aravalli village was 86.76% when compared to 67.02% of Andhra Pradesh.

See also 
 West Godavari district

References 

Villages in West Godavari district